Buena Fe may refer to:

Music
 Buena Fe (band), a Cuban duo

Places
 Buena Fe, Ecuador, a city in Los Ríos Province